John McLean Thompson FRSE FLS (1888–1977) was a 20th-century Scottish botanist.

Life
He was born in Rothesay on the isle of Bute in western Scotland on 22 July 1888, the son of Hugh Thompson. He was educated at Rothesay Academy then studied Science at Glasgow University graduating MA in 1908 and BSc in 1911. In 1914 he began lecturing in Botany at Glasgow University.

From 1913 to 1926 he corresponded with Frederick Orpen Bower.

In the First World War he was attached to various military hospitals as a protozoologist studying infected wounds.

In 1917 he was elected a Fellow of the Royal Society of Edinburgh. His proposers were Frederick Orpen Bower, Sir John Graham Kerr, Thomas Hastie Bryce and John Walter Gregory. He won the Society's Neill Prize for the period 1921 to 1923.

In 1918 he began lecturing in Plant Morphology at Glasgow. In 1921 he was created Professor of Botany at Liverpool University and remained in that role until retiral in 1952. Among his doctoral students was Elsie Conway.

The University of Louvain awarded him an honorary doctorate (DSc) in 1948.

He died on 17 April 1977.

Publications

The Anatomy and Affinity of Deparia Moorei Hook (1915)
Studies in Advancing Sterility (1929)
The Theory of Scitaminean Flowering (1933)
On the Floral Morphology of Elettaria Cardomomum Maton (1936)

Family

In 1920 he married Dr Simone Denil.

References

1888 births
1977 deaths
People from Rothesay, Bute
People educated at Rothesay Academy
Alumni of the University of Glasgow
Academics of the University of Glasgow
Academics of the University of Liverpool
Fellows of the Royal Society of Edinburgh
Fellows of the Linnean Society of London
Scottish botanists